Dale Smith may refer to:
Dale Smith (poet) (born 1967), American poet, editor, and critic
Dale Smith (writer) (born 1976), playwright and author known for his work on Doctor Who spin-offs
Dale Smith (The Bill), fictional character on the television series The Bill
Dale Smith (cowboy) (1928–2017), multiple time Team roping world champion
Dale L. Smith, American political scientist

See also 
 List of people with surname Smith